Zhang Guofeng (Chinese: 张国锋; born 6 January 1989) is a Chinese football player who currently plays for China League One side Shenzhen Ruby.

Club career
In 2011, Zhang Guofeng started his professional footballer career with Shenzhen Ruby in the Chinese Super League. He made his league debut for Shenzhen on 8 May 2011 in a game against Guangzhou Evergrande, coming on as a substitute for Andy Nägelein in the 78th minute.
In 2012, he was loaned to China League Two side Shenzhen Main Sports until 31 December.

Career statistics 
Statistics accurate as of match played 1 November 2015

References

1989 births
Living people
Chinese footballers
Footballers from Jilin
Shenzhen F.C. players
Chinese Super League players
China League One players
Association football midfielders